The 1934–35 Montreal Canadiens season was the team's 26th season of play. The Canadiens again qualified for the playoffs, finishing third in their division. The club met and lost to the New York Rangers in the playoffs.

Regular season
A bombshell trade was made with Howie Morenz, Lorne Chabot, and Marty Burke going to Chicago for Leroy Goldsworthy, Roger Jenkins, and Lionel Conacher. The Canadiens then traded Lionel Conacher and Herb Cain to the Maroons for Nels Crutchfield.

Final standings

Record vs. opponents

Schedule and results

Playoffs
In the first round the Canadiens met the New York Rangers, who had placed third in the American Division. The Canadiens lost the two-games total-goals series 5–6 (1–2, 4–4).

In the first game, there was a bench-clearing brawl after Nels Crutchfield cut Bill Cook on the head with his stick. The police were needed to end the brawl. Crutchfield was given a match penalty with no substitution. The Canadiens played the thirteen minutes one man short and two minutes two men short. Bill Cook returned wearing a helmet over his bandages to score the second Rangers goal.

In the second game, the Canadiens were down 4–1 on the game and tied it with three straight goals in the third. The Canadiens could not get another goal to tie the series.

 New York Rangers  vs. Montreal Canadiens

Player statistics

Regular season
Scoring

Goaltending

Playoffs
Scoring

Goaltending

Awards and records
 Aurel Joliat – NHL Second All-Star team

Transactions
 October 3, 1934 – Traded Howie Morenz, Marty Burke and Lorne Chabot to Chicago Blackhawks for Roger Jenkins, Lionel Conacher and Leroy Goldsworthy.
 October 3, 1934 – Traded Lionel Conacher to Montreal Maroons with the rights to Herb Cain for the rights to Nels Crutchfield.
 October 17, 1934 – Traded Leroy Goldsworthy to Chicago for cash.
 December 18, 1934 – Received Leroy Goldsworthy from Chicago for cash.

See also
1934–35 NHL season

References

Notes

Montreal Canadiens seasons
Montreal Canadiens
Montreal Canadiens